Sinch, formerly CLX Communications, is a telecommunications and cloud communications platform as a service (PaaS) company. Headquartered in Stockholm, Sweden, Sinch also has offices in over 30 cities worldwide, including Atlanta, London, Madrid, San Francisco, Singapore and Sydney.

History

CLX Communications 

CLX Communications, better known as CLX, was founded in 2008 by Johan Hedberg, Robert Gerstmann, Kristian Männik, Henrik Sandell, Björn Zethraeus and Kjell Arvidsson, as a telecommunications and cloud communications platform as a service (PaaS) company. CLX acquired numerous companies in the industry between 2009 and 2018.

In 2014, CLX acquired Voltari's mobile messaging business in the US and Canada.

After announcing its intention to proceed with an initial public offering (IPO) in September 2015, CLX completed the IPO of its shares and began trading on Nasdaq Stockholm in October 2015, with the introduction price set at SEK 59. The company is listed on Nasdaq Stockholm, on the Mid Cap list under the Technology sector.

In 2016 CLX acquired Mblox for US$117 million. At the time, Mblox was one of the largest messaging service providers in the world, delivering 7 billion messages in 2015.

In 2017, CLX acquired German provider Xura Secure Communications GmbH in February 2017, and UK-based Dialogue in May 2017.

Also in 2017, CLX entered into a strategic partnership with Google "to provide the next generation of messaging services to brand marketers using Rich Communications Services (RCS) standard embedded directly into consumers' native messaging apps". Part of Google's Early Access Program (EAP), CLX will enable enterprises to build with RCS and be one of the first companies to offer an upgraded messaging experience.

In March 2018, CLX entered into a definitive agreement to acquire Danish company Unwire Communication ApS for DKK 148 million. Upon completion, CLX will become the largest CPaaS provider in the Nordic region. The following month, they announced that they had acquired Seattle-based company Vehicle for US$8 million.

Symsoft

Symsoft was founded in Stockholm in 1989, to supply charging and messaging services to mobile operators. The company was initially founded as a consultancy company but shifted focus in the late 1990s to sell products. Formerly listed on Nasdaq Stockholm, it provided mobile communications in the areas of Real-Time BSS, SMS and other messaging services, with SS7 security  for mobile network operators (MNOs), mobile virtual network operators (MVNOs) and mobile virtual network enablers (MVNEs).

The first deployment of the Symsoft SMS real-time charging was with TeliaMobile, now Telia Company, in Sweden in 1999. Building on the Telia case and other early projects relating to mobile messaging and real-time charging Symsoft launched the Symsoft Service Delivery Platform (formerly known as the Nobill platform).

In 2009, CLX acquired Symsoft, which then formed the Operator Division of CLX Communications. The division offered software and services to customers in the areas of IoT platforms, real-time BSS, VAS, fraud prevention solutions for revenue retention and full-service solutions for virtual operators.

As of 2016, Symsoft had experience in upgrading and replacing legacy systems in the areas of BSS, Value Added Services and Security. The company serves mobile operators, MVNOs and MVNEs such as America Móvil, Virgin Mobile, Polkomtel, Saudi Telecom, Simfonics Telefónica, Telia Company, Unify Mobile and 3 in 30+ countries.

Mblox

Mblox Inc. was a global company that provided a Carrier-grade SaaS-based mobile messaging platform to enterprises, including global one-way and two-way SMS, MMS, push notifications, ring-tones, shortcodes and virtual mobile numbers. Mblox Ltd. was founded in 1999, by Andrew Bud in London, England.  In 2003, MBlox, Ltd. was acquired by a newly restructured and capitalized Mobilesys, Inc. </ref>.  Founded by David Coelho, a very successful serial entrepreneur, the company assumed the name MBlox, Inc. at Andrew Bud's insistence and operated dual headquarters in Mountainview, CA, and London, England.  This transaction was spearheaded by Q-Advisors, a highly respected boutique Investment Bank founded by Michael Quinn in 2001 and located in Denver, CO.  The CEO of mBlox, Inc. was William "Chip" Hoffman who architected and executed the transaction with the help of Gary Cuccio (Chairman), and Jay Emmet (COO). The new company - Mblox Inc. became the world leader in SMS technology use and carrier clearing and billing, growing from $1.75M in 2002 to over $2B in proforma revenue by April 2004 (19 months)!  This growth was primarily organic with geographic expansion into over 30 countries, including London, San Francisco, Atlanta, Stockholm, Paris, Munich, Madrid, Singapore, Manila, and Sydney.

In 2003, the company acquired carrier-grade message delivery capabilities through the purchase of an SMSC from Comverse.  After stepping down in mid-2004, William "Chip" Hoffman handed the reigns to then-Chairman Gary Cuccio, former Senior Executive with Pacific Telesis, and COO of the wildly successful Omnipoint Wireless.  Gary added the CEO role to his Chairmanship.

From 2005 to 2006, the company opened offices in Singapore and Australia. The year 2009 was marked by the opening of the Milan office, Italy.
 2010: Acquired Mashmobile (Sweden)
 2011: Added direct Latin America two-way messaging services
 2012: Added push and rich-push messaging capability
 2013: Opened offices in Brazil and South Africa
 2014: Acquired Zoove and CardBoardFish; increasing reach and product offerings 
 2015: Mblox acquired 4INFO SMS Services
 2016: Sold Zoove
 2016: Mblox was acquired by CLX Communications AB (Publ)

In December 2017, the parent company CLX Communications retired the Mblox and CardBoardFish brands.

Public criticism and fines
Starting in 2006, with the release of the globally successful "Crazy Frog" ring-tone, MBlox became a target for regulators.  Since phone bills from some carriers attribute charges to the company doing the billing, rather than to the business that actually sold and provided the service, Mblox had been accused in Internet forums of enabling a process called cramming, or automatically signing mobile customers up for unsolicited services and billing them accordingly. As of 2008, the company had been fined 22 times for cramming-related offences, totaling hundreds of thousands of dollars. Since Mblox had never had any involvement, direct or indirect, in creating or promoting such services, its responsibility was to try to prevent its customers abusing the SMS-based billing services it provided them. Following the sudden spate of problems in 2008/9, in 2010 the UK regulator Phonepay Plus commended Mblox for "a significant investment in new technology, personnel and resources to aid compliance and prevent further harm occurring to consumers from services operating over its platform." In the UK, Mblox had not been cited in any case since December 2011, at which time the regulator described its actions as "exemplary". On March 19, 2013, Mblox sold its PSMS business to OpenMarket as it chose to focus exclusively on Enterprise to Consumer mobile messaging. This brought an end to its involvement in mobile payments

Sinch
Sinch was initially founded in May 2014 by Andreas Bernström in Stockholm and San Francisco. Originally the technology behind Rebtel, Sinch was spun-out with $12 million in funding, focusing on the mobile first, app developer market. Sinch launched its Voice and Instant Messaging products in May 2014, and quickly launched their SMS API product at the end of 2014.

In 2016, CLX also acquired Sinch for a total consideration of SEK 138.9 million on a debt-free basis.

Brand Unification 
In February 2019, it was announced that CLX had "launched a new corporate brand and visual identity" to unify all its business units under the same name. After acquiring Sinch in 2016, they have now leveraged the brand name to encompass the entire company to "more accurately and immediately [depict] its current offerings and mission".

Sinch effectively has inherited the history of CLX Communications and is considered a different brand to the one launched in 2014.

CLX completed an initial public offering (IPO) and were listed on Nasdaq Stockholm in October 2015. Since February 2019, the company can be found on the Mid Cap list under the Technology sector under the ticker 'SINCH'.

In February 2021, Sinch acquired Inteliquent, an interconnection provider for voice communications, for $1.14 billion.

Competitors 

Competitors are 8x8, LINK Mobility, Twilio, Infobip, and BICS (TeleSign).

Awards
CEO and Founder Andreas was announced as one of The 9 Most Innovative People in VoIP in 2014.

See also
 Cloud communications
 GSMA
 Short Messaging Service
 Telecommunications

References

Cloud computing providers
Mobile telecommunication services
Mobile technology
Telecommunications companies of Sweden
Cloud communication platforms
Telecommunications companies established in 2008
Swedish companies established in 2008
2016 mergers and acquisitions
Companies based in Stockholm